is a train station on the Osaka Metro Chūō Line in Minato-ku, Osaka, Japan. It is the stop that serves the Osaka Aquarium Kaiyukan aquarium.

Station layout
There is an elevated island platform with two tracks on the third floor.  

Railway stations in Osaka Prefecture
Railway stations in Japan opened in 1961
Osaka Metro stations